Ralph Frank (1946-) is the former American ambassador to Nepal (1997-2001) and Croatia (2003-2006).

Frank received a BA in 1968 and an MBA in 1973 from the University of Washington. 

A cable written by Frank in November 2003 revealed the American interest in obtaining the S-300 surface-to-air missile system from Croatia. The Croatian government acquired the system in 1995, before the Operation Storm, but it was incomplete and was never operative. According to other sources, including the court testimony of arms dealer Zvonko Zubak, the system was indeed shipped to the U.S. in 2004. (See Contents of the United States diplomatic cables leak (Europe))

References

Living people
1946 births
Ambassadors of the United States to Croatia
Ambassadors of the United States to Nepal
University of Washington Foster School of Business alumni
20th-century American diplomats
21st-century American diplomats